Nong Takai railway station is a railway station located in Nong Phai Subdistrict, Mueang Udon Thani District, Udon Thani Province.

References 

Railway stations in Thailand
Udon Thani province